Dolichoctis aculeoides is a ground beetle species first described by Baehr in 1999.

References

Lebiinae
Beetles described in 1999